The 1985–86 Scottish First Division season was won by Hamilton Academical, who were promoted along with Falkirk to  the Premier Division. Ayr United and Alloa Athletic were relegated to the Second Division.

Table

References

1985-1986
2
Scot